Gabriel 'Biel' Ribas Ródenas (born 2 December 1985 in Palma de Mallorca, Balearic Islands) is a Spanish footballer who plays for UCAM Murcia CF as a goalkeeper.

Career statistics

Club

Honours
UCAM Murcia
Segunda División B: 2015–16

Fuenlabrada
Segunda División B: 2018–19

Spain U17
Meridian Cup: 2003

Spain U19
UEFA European Under-19 Championship: 2004

References

External links

1985 births
Living people
Spanish footballers
Footballers from Palma de Mallorca
Association football goalkeepers
La Liga players
Segunda División players
Segunda División B players
Tercera División players
Primera Federación players
RCD Espanyol B footballers
RCD Espanyol footballers
Lorca Deportiva CF footballers
UD Salamanca players
CD Atlético Baleares footballers
CD Numancia players
UCAM Murcia CF players
Real Murcia players
CF Fuenlabrada footballers
Spain youth international footballers